Mário Brandão da Silveira, or simply Marlon (born 26 January 1987), is a Brazilian striker.

Marlon previously played for Thespa Kusatsu in the J2 League.

Club statistics

References

External links

1987 births
Living people
Brazilian footballers
Brazilian expatriate footballers
J2 League players
Thespakusatsu Gunma players
Expatriate footballers in Japan
Association football forwards